In Irish mythology, Bec (modern Irish Beag, meaning "small") was one of the Tuatha Dé Danann. She was known for having a magic well, that would grant wisdom with one drink and foretelling for a second. The well was guarded by her three daughters. When Fionn mac Cumhaill approached the well to ask for a drink, her daughters tried to prevent him from getting the water; "one of them threw water over him to scare him away and some of it went into his mouth. From the water he gained wisdom."

References

Irish goddesses
Tuatha Dé Danann